Mangora passiva is a species of orb weaver in the family Araneidae. It is found in a range from the USA to Nicaragua.

References

Araneidae
Articles created by Qbugbot
Spiders described in 1889